Double Trouble is an American sitcom television series that aired on NBC from April 4, 1984 to March 30, 1985. The series stars identical twins Jean and Liz Sagal as Kate and Allison Foster, two teenagers living under the watchful eye of their widowed father. The show was considered an updating of the "twins in mischief" concept seen in films like The Parent Trap or The Patty Duke Show of the 1960s.  The Sagal sisters acknowledged that Norman Lear, the Sagal family's godfather, was the one who held influence over the show's concept.

Synopsis
Double Trouble premiered in April 1984. Initially, the series was set in Des Moines, Iowa, and generally revolved around the twins' high school or their father's dance studio (thus giving the girls a chance to show off their real-life dancing skills). Most of the show's comedy was generated from the fact that one twin was serious while the other more laid-back and happy-go-lucky.

Beginning as a mid-season replacement, the show also starred Donnelly Rhodes as the girls' father, Art Foster. The show did not generate high enough ratings in its initial debut to be included in NBC's fall schedule; however, it was brought back for a second go-'round as a mid-season replacement in December 1984.  After some retooling, the setting of the show was relocated to New York City.  Rhodes was replaced by Barbara Barrie as the twins' aunt. The second season ran for fifteen episodes. The series was not renewed after the second season, but it was seen in reruns on NBC until August 21, 1985, and for several years on USA Network in the late 1980s and early 1990s.

Cast

 Jean Sagal as Kate Foster
 Liz Sagal as Allison Foster
 Donnelly Rhodes as Art Foster (season 1)
 Patricia Richardson as Beth McConnell (season 1)
 Barbara Barrie as Margo Foster (season 2)
 Anne-Marie Johnson as Aileen Lewis (season 2)
 Michael D. Roberts as Mr. Arrechia (season 2)	
 Jonathan Schmock as Billy Batalato (season 2)
 James Vallely as Charles Kincaid (season 2)

Episodes

Series overview

Season 1 (1984)

Season 2 (1984–85)

U.S. television ratings

References

External links
 
 

1984 American television series debuts
1985 American television series endings
1980s American teen sitcoms
English-language television shows
NBC original programming
Television series about sisters
Television series about teenagers
Television series about twins
Television series by Sony Pictures Television
Television shows set in Iowa
Television shows set in New York City